The Assembly of the Community of Municipalities of the Autonomous Province of Kosovo and Metohija, was the assembly of the association of local governments created by the municipal authorities in Kosovo elected in the May 11, 2008 municipal elections called by the Government of Serbia. It was created in Kosovska Mitrovica (North Kosovo) to represent the municipalities that defy the 2008 Kosovo declaration of independence. The Assembly was composed of 45 representatives delegated by 26 municipalities. The majority of delegates were ethnic Serbs, while some represented Gorani, Bosniak and Romani communities.

The assembly was not part of the government of the Republic of Kosovo and it got dissolved following the 2013 Brussels Agreement.

History

The first session of the Assembly took place on May 11 and the inaugural meeting of the assembly occurred on Vidovdan, the feast day for St. Vitus, June 28 in 2008—a historically important date for Serbs that commemorates the 1389 Battle of Kosovo. Radovan Ničić is the President of the Assembly.

Composition

The seats in the Assembly are divided as follows:
 Serbian Radical Party – 17
 Democratic Party of Serbia – 13
 Socialist Party of Serbia – 4
 Democratic Party – 3
 G17 Plus – 1
 Civic Initiative of Gora – 1
 Independent – 4

International response

The elections which are basis for the Assembly were not recognised by the United Nations Mission in Kosovo (UNMIK) or the government of Kosovo. The creation of the Assembly has been condemned by President of Kosovo Fatmir Sejdiu as an act aimed at destabilising Kosovo, while UNMIK had said the creation of it was not a serious issue because the Assembly would not have an operative role.

Post-Brussels developments

In September 2013, following the 2013 Brussels Agreement, according to which a self-governing association of municipalities with a Serb majority population is to be formed- the Community of Serb Municipalities, Serbia ended its support for the Assembly. Serbia appointed temporary leaders until the 2013 Kosovo municipal elections were completed. The Community of Serb Municipalities outlined in the 2013 Brussels Agreement is yet to be formed.

See also

 Serbs in Kosovo
 Kosovo Serb enclaves
 Serbian National Council of Kosovo and Metohija
 Politics of Kosovo
 Community of Serb Municipalities

References

External links
 Declaration of Establishing the Assembly of the Community of Municipalities of the Autonomous Province of Kosovo and Metohija 
 Deklaracija o osnivanju Skupštine Zajednice opština Autonomne Pokrajine Kosovo i Metohija 

Politics of Serbia
Politics of Kosovo
Political organizations based in Kosovo
Autonomous Province of Kosovo and Metohija
Parallel structures in Kosovo
2008 establishments in Kosovo
Kosovo Serbs
2013 disestablishments in Kosovo